Hélder Fernando Ferreira de Castro (born 24 January 1986 in Fiães (Santa Maria da Feira)) is a Portuguese footballer who plays for Anadia F.C. as an attacking midfielder.

References

External links

1986 births
Living people
Sportspeople from Santa Maria da Feira
Portuguese footballers
Association football midfielders
FC Sion players
Primeira Liga players
Liga Portugal 2 players
Segunda Divisão players
C.D. Feirense players
Portimonense S.C. players
Lusitânia F.C. players
Anadia F.C. players
Liga I players
FC Universitatea Cluj players
ASA 2013 Târgu Mureș players
Cypriot First Division players
Olympiakos Nicosia players
AEK Larnaca FC players
Portuguese expatriate footballers
Expatriate footballers in Switzerland
Expatriate footballers in Romania
Expatriate footballers in Cyprus
Portuguese expatriate sportspeople in Switzerland
Portuguese expatriate sportspeople in Romania
Portuguese expatriate sportspeople in Cyprus